Wheatie may refer to:

 Wheaties cereal
 Lincoln cent#Wheat cent (1909–1958)